Dawn Bowles-Fitch (born November 12, 1968) is a retired American track and field athlete who specialized in the 100 meters hurdles. She represented her country at three outdoor and one indoor World Championships. In addition she won the gold at the 1993 Summer Universiade. Later in life she worked as the head coach for Neptune High School's track and field team.

Her personal bests are 12.84 seconds in the 100 meters hurdles (+0.6 m/s, Stuttgart 1993) and 7.95 seconds in the 60 meters hurdles (Atlanta 1997).

Competition record

References

1968 births
Living people
American female hurdlers
LSU Tigers track and field athletes
African-American female track and field athletes
World Athletics Championships athletes for the United States
Athletics (track and field) coaches
Female sports coaches
African-American sports coaches
Universiade medalists in athletics (track and field)
Athletes (track and field) at the 1991 Pan American Games
Universiade gold medalists for the United States
Medalists at the 1993 Summer Universiade
Pan American Games track and field athletes for the United States
21st-century African-American people
21st-century African-American women
20th-century African-American sportspeople
20th-century African-American women
20th-century African-American people